Pseudohermenias is a genus of moths belonging to the subfamily Olethreutinae of the family Tortricidae.

Species
Pseudohermenias abietana (Fabricius, 1787) (=Pseudohermenias hercyniana (Bechstein & Scharfenberg, 1804))
Pseudohermenias ajanensis Falkovitsh, 1966

See also
List of Tortricidae genera

References

External links
tortricidae.com

Olethreutini
Tortricidae genera